Isabella Bliss (born 1 April 1998) is an Australian woman from Queensland, notable for winning Junior MasterChef Australia (series 1) in 2010.

Junior MasterChef Australia 
Bliss entered the first season of Junior MasterChef Australia with her fraternal twin sister, Sofia. Bliss faced Jack Lark in the final two rounds. Bliss won 97 to 94. As a prize, she received a MasterChef trophy and $15,000. Lark received $10,000 for second prize and Sofia and fellow contestant Siena Johnston $5,000 for third to fourth.

Personal life 
Bliss hopes to open a restaurant with Sofia, using the prize money from a trust fund. They want to name it Is-Sofia. The twins also have a cook book named A little bit of this, a little bit of that, published in 2011.

In 2011 the twins worked with "Cupcake for A Cure", a child cancer charity. They also had the chance to create an Oprah inspired dessert, namely Oprah Gold, with chocolate and a wild Hibiscus surprise.

In November 2013, Bliss was named as one of YWCA Queensland's "125 Leading Women".

Isabella has completed Year 12 and in 2016 commenced study at University of Queensland.  Sofia has deferred a year from University and is currently working.

References

External links 

 Junior MasterChef Australia at the University of Ciputra Surabaya. 9 April 2012

MasterChef Australia
Living people
1998 births
People from Brisbane
Reality cooking competition winners
Australian twins
People educated at All Hallows' School